La Mafia 1986 is the tenth studio album by La Mafia released on April 5, 1986. The album entered the Billboard Latin Regional chart at number 25. It reached number one and stayed there for one week. On September 15, 2017 a re-mastered version of the album was released in digital form.

Track listing

References

1986 albums
La Mafia albums
Spanish-language albums